The most expensive  dog collar in the world is the $3.2 million, diamond-studded Amour Amour, once called “the Bugatti of dog collars”.

The  chandelier-design, 52-carat collar has over 1,600 hand-set diamonds, with a 7-carat, D-IF (flawless) color-graded, brilliant-shaped centerpiece. The Amour Amour also uses platinum, 18-carat  white gold and  crocodile leather.

The collar has been featured nationally on E! Entertainment Television’s "World’s Most Expensive," on Fox News Fox & Friends, an episode of NBC’s “It’s Worth What?" and an episode of ABC’s “20/20.”

It has also appeared on several online blogs, including Newsweek’s “Nine Most Ridiculously Expensive Pet Gifts,” People Pets, Daily Kibble, Hollywood Life, and Teddy Hilton.

The collar was featured internationally in a German “The World of the Super Rich” documentary.

References

Individual items of jewellery
Dog equipment